Donnchad mac Murchada (aka 'Donnchadh Ua Mael-na-mbo' and 'Donnchad grandson of Mael na mBó') was a King of Leinster from 1098 until 1115 when he died in battle while fighting Domnall Gerrlámhach, the King of Dublin. A near contemporary account by Gerald of Wales, suggests that the King of Dublin lured him to Dublin under false pretence of peace, killed him and then buried him with a dog as an insult.

Primary Source Data 
This entry in "The Conquest of Ireland" was written by Gerald of Wales, who was appointed Archdeacon of Brecon  in 1174 and is a respected contemporary historian of that era:

 "Dermitius (Diarmaid mac Murchadha) had a mortal hatred for the citizens of Dublin, and not without reason; for they had murdered his father (Donnchadh mac Murchada), while sitting in the hall of the house of one of the chief men, which he used for his court of justice; and they added insult to the foul deed by burying his corpse with a dog."

This entry in the Annals of the Four Masters speaks the battle of 1115 between Domnall Gerrlámhach (aka Domhnall Ua Briain) and Donnchad mac Murchada (aka Donnchadh Ua Mael-na-mbo):
 M1115.5 "A battle was gained by Domhnall Ua Briain and the foreigners of Ath-cliath over the Leinstermen, wherein fell Donnchadh Ua Mael-na-mbo, lord of Ui-Ceinnsealaigh, and Conchobhair Ua Conchobhair, lord of Ui-Failghe, with his sons, and many others besides them."

This entry in The Annals of Ulster speaks of the battle in 1115 mentioned above between Domnall Gerrlámhach (aka Domnall ua Briain) and Donnchad mac Murchada (aka Donnchad grandson of Mael na mBó):

 U1115.4 "A defeat was inflicted by Domnall ua Briain and the foreigners of Áth Cliath on the Laigin, and in it fell Donnchad grandson of Mael na mBó king of Uí Cheinnselaigh, and Conchobor ua Conchobuir, king of Uí Fhailgi, with their sons and many others besides."

References

1115 deaths
12th-century Irish monarchs
Kings of Leinster